The 2015 NEAFL season was the fifth season of the North East Australian Football League (NEAFL). The season began on Saturday, 11 April and concluded on Saturday, 19 September with the NEAFL Grand Final.  were the premiers, defeating  by one point in the Grand Final.

League structure
The structure of the league follows on from 2014 with a single conference involving the three eastern states/territories (Australian Capital Territory, Queensland, and New South Wales) and the Northern Territory. Three clubs decided not to renew their licenses due to financial complications, including Canberra-based clubs, Belconnen and Queanbeyan, and Sydney-based club, Sydney Hills.

Participating clubs

Premiership season
All starting times are local.

Round 1

Round 2

Round 3

Round 4

Round 5

Round 6

Round 7

Round 8

Round 9

Round 10

Round 11

Round 12

Round 13

Round 14

Round 15

Round 16

Round 17

Round 18

Round 19

Round 20

Round 21

Win/Loss table

Bold – Home game
X – Bye
Opponent for round listed above margin
This table can be sorted by margin

Ladder

Ladder progression
Numbers highlighted in green indicates the team finished the round inside the top 6.
Numbers highlighted in blue indicates the team finished in first place on the ladder in that round.
Numbers highlighted in red indicates the team finished in last place on the ladder in that round.
Underlined numbers indicates the team had a bye during that round.

Finals series

Elimination finals

Preliminary finals

Grand Final

Representative match
The NEAFL representative team played against the Tasmanian State League representative team in the league's sole state match for the year. The match was played on 7 June in Burpengary and the victory was the first time a NEAFL representative side had won since the competition unified in 2014.

Squad
The 2015 NEAFL representative squad consisted of players from all NEAFL clubs excluding AFL reserves teams. The side also included young talent in the NEAFL with the inclusion of three 2015 AFL draftees, Josh Smith, Matt Uebergang, and Josh Wagner. The team was coached by AFL Queensland Hall of Famer and former AFL footballer, John Blair.  captain, Tim Barton, was named as best on ground.

Awards
The NEAFL Rising Star was awarded to Maxwell Kouvaras of >()</ polled most possessions in debut year.

Team of the Year

Rising Star nominations
The NEAFL Rising Star was awarded to the most promising young talent in the NEAFL competition. Players were nominated each week and must have been under the age of 21 and have played less than 20 NEAFL games.

1.No-one nominated due to it being the representative match round.

Best and fairest winners

AFL draftees

N – national draft
R – rookie draft

References

External links
http://www.neafl.com.au/ Official NEAFL website

Australian rules football competition seasons
NEAFL